Bulungan Regency is a regency of North Kalimantan Province in Indonesia. It covers an area of 13,181.92 km2 and had a population of 112,663 at the 2010 Census and 151,844 at the 2020 Census. The administrative centre is at Tanjung Selor.

History
In 2007, three districts (kecamatan) was split from Bulungan Regency to form a new regency, Tana Tidung Regency.

It had been part of the East Kalimantan province, but in 2012 became part of the newly created North Kalimantan province. Tanjung Selor in Bulungan Regency was designated as the province's capital.

Administrative Districts 
The regency is divided into ten districts (kecamatan), tabulated below with their areas and their populations at the 2010 Census and the 2020 Census. The table also includes the locations of the district administrative centres, the number of administrative villages (rural desa and urban kelurahan) in each district, and its postal codes.

Notes: (a) including 5 offshore islands. (b) including 7 offshore islands. (c) including 65 offshore islands. (d) including 10 offshore islands.

Gallery

See also
Sultanate of Bulungan

References

External links 

 

 
Regencies of North Kalimantan